The 2012–13 Segunda División B season was the 36th since its establishment. The first matches of the season were played on 26 August 2012, and the league phase ended on 19 May 2013. The entire season ended on 30 June 2013 with the promotion play-off finals.

Summary before 2012–13 season 
Playoffs de Ascenso:

 Real Madrid Castilla (P)
 CD Tenerife
 CD Lugo (P)
 Albacete Balompié
 CD Mirandés (P)
 SD Ponferradina (P)
 SD Eibar
 SD Amorebieta
 CD Atlético Baleares
 Orihuela CF
 Huracán CF
 CF Badalona
 Cádiz CF
 Real Balompédica Linense
 Lucena CF
 Real Jaén

Relegated from Segunda División:

 Villarreal CF B
 CD Alcoyano
 FC Cartagena
 Gimnàstic de Tarragona

Promoted from Tercera División:

 CD Ourense (from Group 1)
 Caudal Deportivo (from Group 2)
 SD Noja (from Group 3)
 AE Prat (from Group 5)
 Loja CD (from Group 9)
 CE Constància (from Group 11)
 CD Marino (from Group 12)
 Arroyo CP (from Group 14)
 SD Logroñés (from Group 16)
 Barakaldo CF (from Group 4)
 CF Fuenlabrada (from Group 7)
 San Fernando CD (from Group 10)
 Atlético Sanluqueño CF (from Group 10)
 CD Binissalem (from Group 11)
 Yeclano Deportivo (from Group 13)
 Peña Sport FC (from Group 15)
 CD Izarra (from Group 15)
 CD Tudelano (from Group 15)

Relegated:

 Celta de Vigo B (to 3ª Group 1)
 UD Vecindario (to 3ª Group 12)
 UB Conquense (to 3ª Group 18)
 CD Toledo (to 3ª Group 18)
 Montañeros CF (unregistered)
 SD Lemona (to 3ª Group 4)
 Arandina CF (to 3ª Group 8)
 Gimnástica Segoviana CF (to 3ª Group 8)
 Burgos CF (to 3ª Group 8)
 CF Gandía (to 3ª Group 6)
 CD Manacor (to 3ª Group 11)
 Andorra CF (to 3ª Group 17)
 CF Sporting Mahonés (dissolved)
 CD Roquetas (to 3ª Group 9)
 Sporting Villanueva (to 3ª Group 14)
 Lorca Atlético CF (dissolved)
 CF La Unión (dissolved)
 Polideportivo Ejido (dissolved)

Administrative Relegation:
 CD Dénia (to 3ª Group 6)
 Orihuela CF (to 3ª Group 6), readmitted on 5 September 2012 after warrant. Then the Group 3 was expanded to 21 teams.
 CF Palencia (to 3ª Group 8)
 AD Ceuta (to 3ª Group 10)
 CD Badajoz (dissolved)
 CD Puertollano (to 3ª Group 18)

Teams covered vacant places by administrative relegations:

 Avilés (from 3ª Group 2)
 Racing de Santander B (from 3ª Group 3)
 Espanyol B (from 3ª Group 5)
 Levante B (from 3ª Group 6)
 Real Madrid C (from 3ª Group 7)
 UCAM Murcia (from 3ª Group 13)

Groups
According to RFEF the distribution of teams in groups, are as follows:

Group I

 RSD Alcalá
 Atlético Madrid B
 Avilés
 Caudal de Mieres
 Coruxo
 Fuenlabrada
 Getafe B
 Guijuelo
 Leganés
 Marino de Arona
 Marino de Luanco
 Ourense
 Rayo Vallecano B
 Real Madrid C
 Real Oviedo
 Salamanca
 S.S. de los Reyes
 Sporting de Gijón B
 Tenerife
 Zamora

Group II

 Alavés
 Amorebieta
 Barakaldo
 Bilbao Athletic
 Eibar
 Gimnástica Torrelavega
 Izarra
 Lleida Esportiu
 SD Logroñés
 UD Logroñés
 Noja
 Osasuna B
 Peña Sport
 Racing de Santander B
 Real Sociedad B
 Real Unión
 Sestao River
 Teruel
 Tudelano
 Zaragoza B

Group III

 Alcoyano
 At. Baleares
 Badalona
 Binissalem
 Constància
 Espanyol B
 Gimnàstic de Tarragona
 Huracán Valencia
 L'Hospitalet
 Levante B
 Llagostera
 Mallorca B
 Olímpic Xàtiva
 Ontinyent
 Orihuela
 Prat
 Reus Deportiu
 Sant Andreu
 Valencia Mestalla
 Villarreal B
 Yeclano

Group IV

 Albacete
 Almería B
 Arroyo
 At. Sanluqueño
 Betis B
 Cacereño
 Cádiz
 Cartagena
 Écija
 Jaén
 La Roda
 Linense
 Loja
 Lucena
 Melilla
 San Fernando
 San Roque
 Sevilla Atlético
 UCAM Murcia
 Villanovense

Group 1

Stadia and locations

League table

Results

Top goalscorers
Last updated 19 May 2013

Top goalkeepers
Last updated 19 May 2013

Group 2

Stadia and locations

League table

Results

Top goalscorers
Last updated 19 May 2013

Top goalkeepers
Last updated 19 May 2013

Group 3

Stadia and locations

League table

Results

Top goalscorers
Last updated 19 May 2013

Top goalkeepers
Last updated 19 May 2013

Group 4

Stadia and locations

League table

Results

Top goalscorers
Last updated 19 May 2013

Top goalkeepers
Last updated 19 May 2013

See also
 2012–13 Segunda División
 2013 Segunda División B play-offs
 2012–13 Tercera División
 2012–13 Copa del Rey

References

External links
Royal Spanish Football Federation

 
2012-13
3
Spain